Skenea nilarum is a species of minute sea snail, a marine gastropod mollusk in the family Skeneidae.

Description
The size of the shell attains 0.8 mm.

Distribution
This species occurs in the Atlantic Ocean off the Canary Islands.

References

 Engl W., 1996: A new skeneomorph species from Lanzarote; La Conchiglia 280: 21–23
 Gofas, S.; Le Renard, J.; Bouchet, P. (2001). Mollusca, in: Costello, M.J. et al. (Ed.) (2001). European register of marine species: a check-list of the marine species in Europe and a bibliography of guides to their identification. Collection Patrimoines Naturels, 50: pp. 180–213

External links
 

nilarum
Gastropods described in 1996